Tseghakronism is a national/ethnic and political movement towards a renewal of the spiritual, behavioral and cultural identity of the Armenian people. The aim of Tseghakronism is to unite the Armenian people on the territory of their historical homeland within a single Armenian state. 

The movement was founded by Garegin Nzhdeh, and, together with his associates Hayk Asatryan and Nerses Astvatsaturyan, was later refined into the ideology of Taronism (Տարոնականութիւն) - a continuation of Tseghakronism.

References
Notes

Further reading
 Avo: Nzhdeh: his life and activity (Նժդեհ. Կեանքն ու գործունէութիւնը). — Beirut: Hamazgayin, 1968
 Mushegh Lalayan, "The Life and Works of Garegin Nzhdeh", Yerevan, 1997։
 A Barseghyan: The Movement of Tseghakronism (Ցեղակրոն շարժումը). — Boston, 1935.

External links
 
 http://www.historyofarmenia.am/images/menus/1187/Njdeh_1.pdf

Armenian nationalism
Political history of Armenia
National liberation movements
Political movements
Religion and politics